Islord is a rapper and a member of the hip hop group Killarmy. Islord was named Rodney Stevenson at birth, but he, as all members of Killarmy, is a Five Percenter, and, thus, changed his name to Islord. The first three letters of his name: I, S, L, are also the first three letters of "Islam"; in the Five Percent way of life, "Islam" does not represent the religion but "I.S.L.A.M." which is often represented as  "I Self Lord And Master." The name Islord is a reiteration of the rapper's assertion of his divinity: "I Self Lord," and a fusion of the terms "Islam" and "lord." Islord is also known as the "Thief of Baghdad." In addition to appearing on Killarmy's albums, Islord appears on two tracks from Bobby Digital in Stereo and the song "Holy Water" from Dom Pachino's Unreleased solo album.

Discography

Videography

References 

1975 births
Living people
Rappers from New York City
African-American male rappers
Wu-Tang Clan affiliates
Killarmy members
East Coast hip hop musicians
21st-century American rappers